Abacetus complanatus is a species of ground beetle in the subfamily Pterostichinae. It was described by Straneo in 1963.

References

complanatus
Beetles described in 1963